Thorsten Walther (born 20 September 1972) is a German former professional footballer who played as a goalkeeper.

Career
Walther started his career with German third tier side SC Geislingen. Before the second half of 1996–97, he signed for Fortuna Düsseldorf in the German Bundesliga, where he made 49 appearances and suffered relegation to the German second tier. On 14 February 1997, he debuted for Fortuna Düsseldorf in a 2–0 loss to 1. FC Köln. In 1999, Walther signed for French second tier club Toulouse.

References

External links
 

Living people
1972 births
German footballers
Association football goalkeepers
Bundesliga players
2. Bundesliga players
Regionalliga players
Ligue 2 players
Toulouse FC players
FC Augsburg players
VfB Stuttgart players
Fortuna Düsseldorf players
German expatriate footballers
German expatriate sportspeople in France
Expatriate footballers in France